DJ-Kicks: Thievery Corporation is a DJ mix album, mixed by Thievery Corporation. It was released on May 10, 1999 on the Studio !K7 independent record label as part of the DJ-Kicks series.

In 2009 it was awarded a gold certification from the Independent Music Companies Association which indicated sales of at least 100,000 copies throughout Europe.

Track listing
 "Tropicando" - Les Baxter  – 2:34
 "Rebirth" - A Forest Mighty Black  – 4:13
 "Beija Flor" - Da Lata  – 3:33
 "Mother Africa Feeding Sista India/2001" - Fun-Da-Mental / Thievery Corporation  – 1:58
 "Rainbow" - The 13th Sign  – 3:46
 "Success (Thievery Corporation Remix)" - DJ Cam  – 3:00
 "Emerald Alley" - Up, Bustle & Out  – 3:25
 "Exploration" - The Karminsky Experience  – 3:07
 "Coming From The Top" - Thievery Corporation  – 3:23
 "Ponteio (Bonus Beats)" - Da Lata  – 1:22
 "Guiro Electro (Rainer Trüby Trio Remix)" - Bobby Matos  – 4:20
 "Fedime's Flight" - Jazzanova  – 4:59
 "Janine" - Pronoia  – 3:40
 "Imperial" - Lazyboy  – 3:40
 "Transmission Central (Thievery Corporation Remix)" - Rockers Hi-Fi  – 4:14
 "Mathar (Richard Fearless Mix)" - Indian Vibes  – 3:47
 "Reign Dub" - Dual Tone  – 4:13
 "It Takes A Thief/DJ Kicks" - Thievery Corporation  – 4:09

References

External links 
DJ-Kicks website

Thievery Corporation
1999 compilation albums